The 2016 Delray Beach International Tennis Championships was a professional men's tennis tournament played on hard courts. It was the 24th edition of the tournament, and was part of the World Tour 250 series of the 2016 ATP World Tour. It took place in Delray Beach, United States between 15 February and 21 February 2016.

Singles main-draw entrants

Seeds

1 Rankings as of February 8, 2016

Other entrants 
The following players received wildcards into the main draw:
 Juan Martín del Potro
 Noah Rubin
 Tim Smyczek

The following player received entry as a special exempt:
 Taylor Fritz

The following players received entry from the qualifying draw:
 Radu Albot
 Tatsuma Ito
 Dennis Novikov
 John-Patrick Smith

Withdrawals 
Before the tournament
  Lu Yen-hsun →replaced by  Malek Jaziri
  Milos Raonic (right adductor injury) →replaced by  Austin Krajicek

Retirements 
  Kevin Anderson (shoulder injury)
  Mikhail Kukushkin (leg injury)

Doubles main-draw entrants

Seeds 

1 Rankings are as of February 8, 2016.

Other entrants 
The following pairs received wildcards into the main draw:
 Benjamin Becker /  Frank Moser
 Bjorn Fratangelo /  Dennis Novikov

The following pair received entry as alternates:
 Sander Groen /  Adelchi Virgili

Withdrawals 
Before the tournament
 Steve Johnson (shoulder injury)

During the tournament
 Mikhail Kukushkin (leg injury)

Finals

Singles 

 Sam Querrey defeated  Rajeev Ram 6–4, 7–6(8–6)

Doubles 

  Oliver Marach /  Fabrice Martin defeated  Bob Bryan /  Mike Bryan 3–6, 7–6(9–7), [13–11]

References

External links
Official website

Delray Beach Open by The Venetian Las Vegas
 
Delray Beach International Tennis Championships
Delray Beach International Tennis Championships
Delray Beach International Tennis Championships
Delray Beach Open